Where Is the Venkatalakshmi is a 2019 Indian Telugu-language horror comedy film starring Raai Laxmi. The film was released on 15 March 2019. The film received negative reviews with criticism for the characters, direction and screenplay.

Cast 
 Raai Laxmi as Venkatalakshmi
 Madhunandan as Pandugadu
 Praveen as Chantigadu
 Pujita Ponnada as Gowri
 Pankaj Kesari as Veera Reddy, a rowdy
 Ram Karthik as Sekhar
 Brahmaji as Suryam
 Jabardasth Mahesh
 Gemini Suresh
 Ramana Reddy

Production 
The film was shot in Hyderabad.

Soundtrack 
Soundtrack was composed by Hari Gowra.
"Kannamesi Nodi Kanta" – Lokeshwar
"Yem Jaruguthondi Nalo" – Kaala Bahirava, Harini
"Rara Venu Gopabala" – Harini, Lokeshwar, Saicharan
"Yemaya Chesindo" – Hari Gowra
"Papa Atthili Papa" – Mangli, Hari Gowra, Lokeshwar, Saicharan, Arun, Raghu Ram

Marketing 
The trailer was released on 19 February.

Release 
The Times of India gave the film one-and-a-half out of five stars and wrote that "It's almost as if the writers of Where Is the Venkatalakshmi decided to sit at the table and create the worst characters to ever be made on-screen". New Indian Express gave the film two out of five stars and wrote that "Despite having some potential cast, director Kishore Kumaar has to take the blame for failing them miserably and not making this script work today". 123 Telugu wrote "On the whole, Where Is the Venkatalakshmi is a good script gone wrong kind of a film. Lakshmi Rai, comedians Madhu and Praveen try to save the film with their sincere efforts but the second half has nothing going its way and kills the interest of the audience."

References

External links 

2010s ghost films
2010s Telugu-language films
2019 comedy horror films
2019 films
Films set in Andhra Pradesh
Films set in Konaseema
Films shot in Andhra Pradesh
Indian comedy horror films
Indian ghost films